Alexander I (known as Alexander the Good;  – 1 January 1432) was Voivode of Moldavia between 1400 and 1432. He was the son of Roman I and succeeded Iuga to the throne. As ruler he initiated a series of reforms while consolidating the status of the Principality of Moldavia.

Reign

Internal politics 
Alexander expanded the bureaucratic system by creating the "Council of the Voivode", the Chancellory and by adding (in 1403) the institution of Logofăt – Chancellor of the official Chancellery.

During his reign, he introduced new fiscal laws by adding commercial privileges to the traders of Lviv (1408) and Kraków (1409), improved the situation of trading routes (especially the one linking the port of Cetatea Albă to Poland), strengthened the forts by guarding them and expanded the Moldavian ports of Cetatea Albă and Chilia.

He also had a role in ending the conflict of the Moldavian Orthodox Church with the Patriarch of Constantinople. He built Bistrița Monastery where he is buried and continued the building of Neamț Monastery, which was started in the previous century.

Alexander made the first documented confirmation of gypsy slavery in Moldavia, giving Bistrița Monastery 31 gypsy families along with some cattle.

Foreign affairs 
The main concern of Alexander the Good was to defend the country in wars against superior armies. In order to do that, he forged a system of alliances with Wallachia and Poland, generally against Hungary (although he had been backed to the throne by Sigismund of Hungary). In 1402, he was sworn vassal of Jogaila, the King of Poland. The treaty was renewed in 1404, 1407, 1411, and 1415. 

Alexander participated in two battles against the Teutonic Knights: the Battle of Grunwald and the Siege of Marienburg. In 1420, he also defended Moldavia against the first incursion by Ottomans at Cetatea Albă. He also got involved in the power struggles of Wallachia by helping Radu II Prasnaglava in 1418 and 1419 and Alexandru I Aldea in 1429, mostly in order to prevent the capture of Chilia.

Due to a territorial claim of Poland and the previous failure of the Polish king to fulfill his part of the vassalic treaty during an Ottoman attack in 1420, Alexander launched an attack on Poland during the Lithuanian Civil War. The attack ended with the Treaty of Suceava on 18 November 1431.

Personal life 
Alexander had a number of wives: Margareta Loszonc, Ana Neacşa, Rimgailė (daughter of Kęstutis and sister of Vytautas the Great; divorced in 1421). He had several children, among whom were Iliaș, Petru III, Stephen II, Peter Aaron, and Bogdan II.

He died on 1 January 1432 and was buried in Bistriţa Monastery.

References

External links 
 

15th-century Romanian people
1370s births
1432 deaths
Burials at Bistrița Monastery
House of Bogdan-Mușat
People in the Battle of Grunwald
Rulers of Moldavia
Year of birth uncertain